Callopatiria formosa, the Grey starfish or Beautiful starfish, is an echinoderm in the family Asterinidae found in South Africa

Originally described as Parasterina formosa by T. Mortensen, in Echinoderms of South Africa (Asteroidea and Ophiuroidea), 1933.

References

Animals described in 1933